Rank comparison chart of non-commissioned officers (NCOs) and enlisted personnel for all armies and land forces of European states.

NCO and enlisted ranks

See also 
 Military rank
 Comparative army officer ranks of Europe
 Comparative army enlisted ranks of the Americas
 Comparative army enlisted ranks of Asia
 Ranks and insignia of NATO armies enlisted

Notes

References 

Military comparisons